Star Wars Battlefront is an action shooter video game developed by DICE, with additional work from Criterion Games, and published by Electronic Arts in November 2015. The game, based on the Star Wars film franchise, is the third major release in the Star Wars: Battlefront sub-series, but is considered a reboot to the previous games, instead of a sequel, to reflect the new Star Wars canon that Lucasfilm established (to replace the Star Wars expanded universe) after being acquired by The Walt Disney Company.

Battlefront received mixed to positive reviews from critics, who praised its gameplay, visuals, music, technical aspects and high production values, but criticized its lack of content at launch in both single and multiplayer modes, and use of a season pass model. Despite this, the game was a commercial success with more than 14 million copies sold worldwide. A sequel, Star Wars Battlefront II, was released on November 17, 2017.

Gameplay

Star Wars Battlefront is an action game played from either a first-person or third-person view; players can switch views whenever desired, similar to previous games, except when controlling "hero" characters or their personal guards. Players traverse planets from the original Star Wars trilogy, such as Endor, Hoth, Tatooine, Bespin, and Sullust, as well as the planet of Jakku introduced in the sequel trilogy. To navigate the game's various maps, players use a variety of vehicles, including both air and land-based vehicles, such as speeder bikes and AT-STs, which can be unlocked during every match by finding tokens that spawn randomly across the map. Battles are planet-based, restricting players from exploring space. The only maps that are space-based were added through DLC, namely in the "Death Star" pack (released in September 2016), which included the titular Death Star, and the "Rogue One" pack (released in December 2016 and based on the movie of the same name), which included Scarif. The game's weapons, characters, gear, and abilities are customizable. As new weapons are unlocked, players have the ability to share them with their teammates. Battlefront does not feature iron sights apart from one blaster, but allows players to zoom in for better accuracy.

The game lets players choose whether to control a Rebel Alliance soldier or an Imperial Stormtrooper. Players can also assume the role of iconic characters from the Star Wars films, which serve as "heroes" and, similarly to vehicles, are unlocked during every match by finding specific tokens across the map. At launch, the hero roster included Luke Skywalker, Darth Vader, Han Solo, Emperor Palpatine, Leia Organa, and Boba Fett, with Nien Nunb, Greedo, Lando Calrissian, Dengar, Bossk, Chewbacca, Jyn Erso, and Orson Krennic being added later through DLC. Non-playable characters such as C-3PO, Admiral Ackbar, and Jabba the Hutt also make minor appearances in the game. The game includes cooperative missions, which can be played offline, but excludes a campaign mode. Players can complete the missions both independently and with bots or another player; the game supports split screen on consoles. The game's online multiplayer mode supports up to 40 players in one match and consists of 16 multiplayer maps. These maps feature five locations from the Star Wars universe: Hoth, Tatooine, Endor, Sullust, and Jakku, with three more locations added through different DLCs: Cloud City on Bespin, the Death Star, and Scarif.

Multiplayer
Multiplayer is the main focus of Battlefront. There are many different modes: 
Walker Assault
A mode where there are 40 players on each team, the Rebels and the Imperials. The Rebel's objective is to destroy the Empire's AT-AT walkers, which are advancing on their position. The Empire's objective is to prevent them from doing so. The Rebels must keep their uplink stations online so their Y-Wing bombers will be able to perform bombing runs on the walkers. The Empire must keep the uplinks offline or shut them down when necessary. 
Fighter Squadron
A starship-only mode, basically team deathmatch in the sky. Additionally, each side will spawn in a transport ship, which the other team must destroy. Either team wins upon reaching 200 points. 
Blast
A team deathmatch-type mode with 20 players. Whichever team gets 100 kills first wins. 
Supremacy
A 40-player mode; the objective for both teams is to capture as many control points as possible. The team that captures the most control points will win.
Hero Hunt
A "Cat-and-Mouse" style game mode which pits a single Hero character against seven other players on the opposing team. The Hero must stay alive as long as possible and kill attacking pursuers. Once a pursuer kills the Hero, the round ends and the players that dealt the most damage will become the next Hero. The person with the highest number of kills at the end of the match, or the first one to obtain 50 will win the game.
Heroes vs. Villains
This round-based game mode features all hero and villain characters from the Rebel Alliance and Galactic Empire. Teams of six must keep their three heroes or villains (four in the Outer Rim maps) alive while destroying the enemy heroes or villains of the other team. The heroes or villains are supported by infantry. For heroes and villains that have bodyguards, they are limited to two spawns only. The first team to win five rounds will win the match.
Cargo
This game mode has two teams of six tying to steal each other's cargo whilst defending their own. It is very similar to the capture the flag.

Development and release

In May 2013, publisher Electronic Arts obtained exclusive rights to develop Star Wars games for gaming consoles, and its subsidiaries DICE, Visceral Games, and BioWare started work on Star Wars games after LucasArts was shut down. DICE first acknowledged the game at Electronic Arts' E3 2013 press conference, along with a teaser trailer. The game is built with the Frostbite 3 engine; studio head Patrick Söderlund stated that the game would be "DICE's interpretation of what Battlefront should be", while still incorporating elements from the previous two games. As such, DICE did not brand the new game as a sequel to Battlefront II, but a reboot of the franchise. Söderlund said that the game almost was not developed, but that staffers at DICE lobbied to be given the project; he called DICE's development of Battlefront "a match made in heaven". Instead of using traditional modeling techniques, the developers used photogrammetry to produce the assets. Small teams formed by artists were responsible for selecting the right assets that could be used by level designers to build maps. According to DICE, the process of developing the assets for the game took half as much time as developing the assets for Battlefield 4, which were produced by using traditional modeling techniques.

In June 2014, it was revealed at EA's E3 2014 press conference that the ice planet Hoth and the forest moon of Endor would be playable maps for the game. In late October of that year, it was revealed that the game would be released Christmas 2015, tying in with the release of Star Wars: The Force Awakens. To meet the deadline, the team had to remove the game's single-player campaign mode. In early March 2015, the first gameplay footage of the game was shown at a private retail event and received a standing ovation from the audience. In April 2015, at Star Wars Celebration 2015 in Anaheim, California, the first gameplay details and the second trailer was released. The first downloadable content of the game, entitled Battle of Jakku, was also announced during the event.

In April 2015, EA announced that Battlefront would release in North America on November 17 and in Europe on November 20 of that year. They also announced that the game would be released in Australia on November 18. It has been stated that the release date for Europe would fall on November 19. It was confirmed that the game would not feature the Battlelog system, but to use a new system developed by Uprise, an Electronic Arts subsidiary based in Sweden, which has previously worked on the Battlelog system of Battlefield 4. On June 15, further gameplay was shown at E3 2015 depicting the Walker Assault mode on Hoth from perspectives of both the Rebel Alliance and the Galactic Empire using various weapons, items and vehicles such as the AT-AT walker, Snowspeeders and TIE Fighters ending with playable characters Luke Skywalker and Darth Vader engaging in battle. Another gameplay trailer featuring cooperative missions was also shown at the event. An open beta of the game was released for PC, PlayStation 4 and Xbox One on October 8. The beta includes the Walker Assault, Drop Zone, and Survival mission modes. The beta was originally set to close on October 12 but was extended to October 13 for testing of "extreme scenarios". The beta was played by more than nine and a half million players. According to Electronic Arts, it was their largest beta.

Fellow EA developer Criterion Games helped DICE develop the speeder bikes for the game. Visceral Games also assisted in an undisclosed capacity.

Downloadable content
Star Wars Battlefront features downloadable content (DLC).  A season pass was announced on October 12, 2015, and includes four DLC packs. The Ultimate Edition was released digitally that includes the Deluxe Edition of the game and the season pass. Aside from the contents of the season pass, additional content will be released for free, which includes new maps and star cards.

The first downloadable content release, titled Battle of Jakku, was revealed during Star Wars Celebration 2015 and was available as a free download to players on December 8, 2015. Players who pre-ordered the game received the Battle of Jakku DLC a week earlier, on December 1, 2015. It features two maps set on planet Jakku. Outer Rim is the second downloadable content for the game, which was released on March 22, 2016. It adds maps set in Jabba the Hutt's palace in Tatooine and a factory area in Sullust. It also includes iconic characters Nien Nunb and Greedo. The DLC is available to players who have purchased the game's Season Pass. Outer Rim is the first of the four DLC packs planned for Season Pass owners. The second expansion pack is titled Bespin, and was released on June 21, 2016. It introduces the Cloud City, Bespin, and allows players to play as the hero Lando Calrissian and the bounty hunter Dengar. The third expansion pack, titled Death Star, was released on September 20, 2016, and marked the debut of the Death Star in the game, as well as Chewbacca, and bounty hunter Bossk, as playable characters. The final expansion pack as part of the Season Pass, Rogue One: Scarif, was released on December 20, 2016, based on the 2016 film Rogue One: A Star Wars Story. The expansion pack debuted the new tropical planet of Scarif introduced in the film. The expansion pack introduces characters Director Orson Krennic for the Empire and Jyn Erso for the Rebellion.

Rogue One: X-Wing VR Mission
Criterion Games developed a PlayStation VR exclusive mission titled Rogue One: X-Wing VR Mission, taking place alongside the events of the 2016 Star Wars Anthology film, Rogue One: A Star Wars Story. It was released free for the PlayStation 4 version of the game in December 2016 and requires the PlayStation VR headset and PlayStation Camera.

Tie-in game
Base Command is a companion app available on the App Store and Google Play. Base Command can be played with or without owning Star Wars Battlefront. Players defend the Rebel base from the Galactic Empire using Star Cards featuring  vehicles, weapons, and power-ups. In the companion app, players can earn virtual credits, which can be used to unlock star cards, weapons, and character customization in the main game.

Reception

Pre-release
Leon Hurley of GamesRadar had a positive impression of Star Wars Battlefront beta. He praised the game's gunplay for its being "strong" and seeming "great" but heavily criticized Walker Assault, one of the game's modes, for its difficulty of winning it as a Rebel. He compared the game's visuals to the Star Wars films' realistic clashes. Moreover, he praised the accuracy of Stormtroopers for its being "at least 100% true to the movie" and called wave-one soldiers "exceptionally special" while pointing out the flaw that the game had an unusual balance of Star Wars heroes and villains. For example, Darth Vader would be splatted by any passing ship while Luke Skywalker would have "far more luck on the 'looking epic' side of things" such as successfully destroying an AT-ST solo. Another flaw which he had pointed out is the "weird" and "infuriating" timing of ending scenes in which screens overlap the ends of matches.

The game's lack of a campaign for the single-player mode was criticized. Steven Storm of Ars Technica praised the visuals, stating: "DICE has at least captured the look and feel of Star Wars, perhaps better than any other game with the license before it." He likened gameplay to the "standard Battlefield formula of walk, get shot, respawn, and repeat...".

Post-release

Star Wars Battlefront received "mixed reviews" for the PC and PlayStation 4 and positive reviews for the Xbox One, according to video game review aggregator Metacritic. Mizuho Securities analyst Neil Doshi noted the negative reviews, but predicted that the game would prevail as a financial hit. Mike Mahardy of GameSpot criticised the game's combat as repetitive. Dan Ryckert of Giant Bomb praised the game for capturing the Star Wars feel. Due to heavy criticism about the gameplay's lack of depth and approach to casual gamers,  Blake Jorgensen, Electronic Arts' chief financial officer admitted that the game was intentionally designed to be accessible for those new to first-person shooter games, or children wanting to play with their parents, going against the hardcore fanbase of Star Wars: Battlefront (2004).

The universal consensus among many critics is that the game's details are generally praiseworthy. For that reason, Mitch Dyer of IGN referred to the game as one of the best-looking games of the generation.

The feeling of Battlefronts lack of content upon release was noticed by several critics. Andrew Reiner of Game Informer criticized the Season Pass approach by feeling a little cheated given the sparse content available at launch.

The Official UK PlayStation Magazine listed the X-Wing mission as the fifth best PS VR game.

Sales
Electronic Arts expected the game to sell nine to ten million copies before the end of the company's 2016 financial year on March 31, 2016. After the release of the game's beta, the company hoped the game to sell at least 13 million copies by the end of March 2016. Star Wars Battlefront debuted at number one in the UK for retail non-digital sales according to Chart-Track in its first week of release, and became the fourth fastest-selling title released in 2015. It marked the biggest launch of a video game in the Star Wars franchise, and exceeded the sales of Star Wars: The Force Unleashed, the previous record holder, by 117%. It was also the fastest-selling online PlayStation 4 video game in the UK, breaking the record previously held by Destiny.

In early December 2015, GameStop president Tony Bartel told retail investors that a number of key November games had sold fewer copies than the chain had expected. Star Wars Battlefront was one of three titles listed, along with Halo 5 and Assassin's Creed Syndicate. Peter Moore, however, defended 's launch sales and spoke out to investors to say that Electronic Arts was still standing by its target of selling 13 million copies by the end of March 2016. According to analyst Michael Pachter, 12 million copies had been sold as of December 31, 2015. Electronic Arts made its sales goal of shipping 13 million copies of the game by the start of 2016 and had shipped 14 million copies by May 2016. Although launched in 2015, the game sold well enough to be the seventeenth best-selling game in the UK in 2016. In Japan, the PlayStation 4 version sold 123,908 copies within its first week of release, placing it at number one on the all format sales chart.

Awards

Sequel

A sequel developed by EA DICE, Motive Studios and Criterion Games was released on November 17, 2017.

References

External links

 
 

2015 video games
Asymmetrical multiplayer video games
Digital Illusions CE games
Electronic Arts games
First-person shooters
Frostbite (game engine) games
LucasArts games
Multiplayer and single-player video games
PlayStation 4 games
Science fiction video games
Space opera video games
Split-screen multiplayer games
Star Wars: Battlefront
Third-person shooters
Video game reboots
Video games developed in Sweden
Windows games
Xbox One games
Interactive Achievement Award winners
D.I.C.E. Award for Action Game of the Year winners